Shuanggang is a town in Tongyu County in northwestern Jilin province, China, located  north-northwest of the county seat. , it has 2 residential communities and 5 villages under its administration.

See also 
 List of township-level divisions of Jilin

References 

Township-level divisions of Jilin